La banda Casaroli is a 1962 Italian crime-drama film directed by Florestano Vancini. The film is based on real life events of criminal group led by Paolo Casaroli.

Cast 
Renato Salvatori: Paolo Casaroli
Jean-Claude Brialy: Corrado Minguzzi
Tomas Milian: Gabriele Ingenis
Gabriele Tinti: Agent Spinelli

References

External links

1962 films
1962 crime drama films
1960s Italian-language films
Films directed by Florestano Vancini
Italian crime drama films
Biographical films about Italian bandits
Films scored by Mario Nascimbene
1960s Italian films